"Pretending" is a rock song written and composed by Jerry Lynn Williams. It was released in 1989 on Eric Clapton's Journeyman as the first track of the album. The song was released as the lead single from the album, backed with "Before You Accuse Me" in USA and Europe and "Hard Times" in UK, and reached #55 on the Billboard Hot 100, making it the album's highest-charting single on that chart. It was also #1 on the Hot Mainstream Rock Tracks chart. In the Netherlands, it reached #3 on the Dutch Tip 40 and #24 on the Dutch Top 40. It became a live favorite.

The song begins with a piano introduction.  Clapton uses a wah wah pedal on the song.  Author Marc Roberty describes the wah-wah solos as being "superlative."  Roberty criticizes Steve Ferrone's drumming on the song for being too heavy handed. Allmusic critic Matthew Greenwald praises the song's "great guitar hook" and Clapton's "great vocal and guitar performances" on the song.  However, Greenwald believes that the song's arrangement is overdone, particularly the "brassy synthesizers," and feels that the song dated quickly due to its pop music elements.

From the CD liner notes on Pretending: "Jimmy Bralower - Drum Programming" Steve Ferrone is not listed as drummer on the song.

Music video
The music video features Clapton and his band playing in a dark rainy city at night. Clapton has stated in interviews that the idea was based on Akira Kurosawa's Seven Samurai.

Credits
 Eric Clapton – lead vocals, guitar 
 Jerry Lynn Williams – guitar, backing and harmony vocals 
 Greg Phillinganes – acoustic piano 
 Jeff Bova – synth organ, synth horns
 Alan Clark – Hammond organ, synth horns, sequenced bass
 Nathan East – bass guitar, backing vocals 
 Jimmy Bralower – drum programming 
 Carol Steele – congas 
 Chaka Khan – backing vocals

References

Eric Clapton songs
1989 singles
Songs written by Jerry Lynn Williams
1989 songs
Song recordings produced by Russ Titelman